Dyschirius aeneolus is a species of ground beetle in the subfamily Scaritinae. It was described by John Lawrence LeConte in 1850.

References

aeneolus
Beetles described in 1850